See You Up There is a live album by the punk band Stiff Little Fingers, released in 1989 (see 1989 in music).

Track listing
"Go For It (Intro)" (Stiff Little Fingers)
"Alternative Ulster" (Stiff Little Fingers, Gordon Ogilvie)
"Silver Lining" (Stiff Little Fingers, Ogilvie)
"Roots, Radicals, Rockers and Reggae" (Stiff Little Fingers)
"Love of the Common People" (John Hurley, Ronnie Wilkins)
"Gotta Gettaway" (Stiff Little Fingers, Ogilvie)
"Just Fade Away" (Stiff Little Fingers, Ogilvie)
"Piccadilly Circus" (Stiff Little Fingers)
"Gate 49" (Stiff Little Fingers)
"Wasted Life" (Burns)
"At the Edge" (Stiff Little Fingers)
"Listen" (Stiff Little Fingers)
"Barbed Wire Love" (Stiff Little Fingers, Ogilvie)
"Fly the Flag" (Stiff Little Fingers, Ogilvie)
"Tin Soldiers" (Stiff Little Fingers, Ogilvie)
"The Wild Rover" (Traditional; arranged by McMordie, Taylor, Cluney, Burns and Russell Emanuel)
"Wait and See" (Burns, Ogilvie)
"Suspect Device" (Stiff Little Fingers, Ogilvie)
"Johnny Was" (Bob Marley)

Personnel
Stiff Little Fingers
Jake Burns – vocals, guitar
Dolphin Taylor – drums
Henry Cluney – guitar
Ali McMordie – bass

1989 live albums
Stiff Little Fingers live albums
Caroline Records live albums
Albums recorded at the Brixton Academy